Svoboda is a rural locality (a selo) in Filonovskoye Rural Settlement, Bogucharsky District, Voronezh Oblast, Russia. The population was 175 as of 2010. There are 3 streets.

Geography 
Svoboda is located 17 km north of Boguchar (the district's administrative centre) by road. Filonovo is the nearest rural locality.

References 

Rural localities in Bogucharsky District